The William Donald Schaefer Memorial Stakes is an American Thoroughbred horse race held annually during the third week of May at Pimlico Race Course in Baltimore, Maryland. A Grade III event open to three-year-old horses and up, it is contested on dirt over a distance of  miles (nine furlongs). This race had been run as the Never Bend Handicap from its inception in 1987 through 1993.

Namesake 

The race was named in honor of former Maryland Governor and industry advocate William Donald Schaefer (1921-2011). Schaefer was an American politician who served in public office for 50 years at both the state and local level in Maryland. A Democrat, he served as mayor of Baltimore from 1971 to 1987, the 58th Governor of Maryland from 1987 to 1995, and the Comptroller of Maryland from 1999 to 2007.

Race info 
The William Donald Schaefer Handicap became an American graded stakes race in 2001. In 2007, the race was won by West Point Thoroughbred's Flashy Bull a multiple grade one winner including a win in the Stephen Foster Handicap. The stakes record was held by Tidal Surge who won the race in 1995 in a time of 1:48.19.

Records 

Speed record: 
  miles - 1:47.10 - Private Terms (1989)
  miles - 1:42.20 - Senator to Be (1991)

Most wins by an owner:
 2 - West Point Thoroughbreds    (2004, 2007)

Most wins by a jockey:
 3 - Jerry Bailey    (1998, 2001, 2005)
 3 - Pat Day    (1991, 1992, 2000)

Most wins by a trainer:
 3 - Nick Zito    (1991, 1992, 1998)

Winners

See also 
 William Donald Schaefer Handicap top three finishers

References 

Graded stakes races in the United States
1987 establishments in Maryland
Pimlico Race Course
Horse races in Maryland
Recurring sporting events established in 1987